The 2022 Warrington Wolves season is the 27th consecutive season in the Super League and their 19th season at the Halliwell Jones Stadium. Warrington were coached by Daryl Powell and they competed in both Super League XXVII and the 2022 Challenge Cup.

2022 Super League table

2022 squad

External links
Rugby League Project

Super League website

 

Warrington Wolves seasons
2022 in English rugby league
Super League XXVII by club